This is a list of the tallest extant birds according to maximum height. Birds range from a tiny bee hummingbird (Mellisuga helenae), which is only 5–6 cm, to the giant African ostrich (Struthio camelus), almost 280 cm in height.

References 

Lists of birds